Smrje is a village south of Prem in the Municipality of Ilirska Bistrica in the Inner Carniola region of Slovenia.

Name
The name Smrje is probably derived from *Smьrďane, a plural demonym from the Slavic common noun *smьrdъ 'simple man'. However, it may also be derived from the identical Slavic common noun *smьrdъ 'juniper' and may therefore refer to the local vegetation.

Mass graves
Smrje is the site of five known mass graves or unmarked graves the end of the Second World War. They all contain the remains of German soldiers from the 97th Corps that fell at the beginning of May 1945. The adjacent Ločice 2 Mass Grave lies on the edge of the meadow and contains the remains of 10 or 11 soldiers.

Church
The local church in the settlement is dedicated to John the Baptist and belongs to the Parish of Prem.

References

External links
Smrje on Geopedia

Populated places in the Municipality of Ilirska Bistrica